Gondwana is a reggae group from La Pincoya, Santiago, Chile, founded in 1987 by I-Locks Labbé. They have been produced by Dr. Dread of RAS Records. With their charismatic leader Quique Neira, they found success in Chile and abroad, as the band played shows in Jamaica and the United States, cradles of reggae.

Discography
Gondwana (1997)
Alabanza (Por la Fuerza de la Razón) or Second Coming (2000)
Made in Jamaica (2002)
Crece (2005)
Resiliente (2007)
En Vivo en Buenos Aires (CD/DVD) (2010)
Revolución (2011)
Reggae and Roll (2014)
Carpe Diem (2017)

External links
 

Chilean reggae musical groups